Heather Willens (born October 11, 1971) is an American former professional tennis player.

Willens was raised in California and attended Palisades High School, then continued a family tradition by joining Stanford University. She is the daughter of Wimbledon quarter-finalist Jane Albert Willens and granddaughter of San Francisco 49ers quarterback Frankie Albert, both of whom played for Stanford in their respective sports.

A three-time All-American, she amassed a 91–14 record in dual singles, during her time at Stanford from 1990 to 1993.

On the professional tour, Willens reached a best singles ranking of 379 in the world while competing in the occasional tournament. She made her only WTA Tour main draw appearance at the 1993 Mazda Classic in San Diego and took part in the qualifying draw for the 1993 US Open.

ITF finals

Doubles: 1 (1–0)

References

External links
 
 

1971 births
Living people
American female tennis players
Stanford Cardinal women's tennis players
Tennis people from California